Einar Kielland Skavlan (30 July 1882 – 16 August 1954) was a Norwegian journalist, newspaper editor, theatre critic and theatre director.

Biography
Skavlan was born in Frogn. His father, Olaf Skavlan, was writer, literary historian and professor. He was also father of actress and theatre director Merete Skavlan.

Skavlan was a journalist for Verdens Gang from 1907, and for Tidens Tegn from 1910. He was editor-in-chief for Dagbladet from 1915 to 1954, except for his period as director for the National Theatre from 1928 to 1930.

He was a member of the Norwegian Association for Women's Rights, where his father had been a member of the first board of directors.

From 1 April 1942 to 19 October 1943 while he was serving as the editor-in-chief of Dagbladet he was imprisoned in Grini concentration camp.

References

20th-century Norwegian journalists
1882 births
1954 deaths
Norwegian theatre directors
Norwegian newspaper editors
Dagbladet people
Grini concentration camp survivors
Norwegian Association for Women's Rights people
People from Frogn
Norwegian prisoners and detainees